This is a list of oil and gas fields operated by BP.

United Kingdom 
All fields in British territory are operated as part of the BP's North Sea Strategic Performance Unit from their office in Dyce, Aberdeen.  This includes some fields not strictly in the North Sea itself.  Fields in the Norwegian sector are operated from Stavanger.

Onshore
 Wytch Farm in Dorset  (transferred to Perenco ownership 2011)

Southern North Sea
 Amethyst gas field (transferred to Perenco ownership, being decommissioned 2021)
 Cleeton gas field (transferred to Perenco ownership 2012)
 Ravenspurn gas fields (transferred to Perenco ownership 2012)
 West sole gas field (transferred to Perenco ownership 2012)

Central North Sea
 Andrew oilfield (transferred to Premier Oil ownership 2020)
 Cyrus oilfield (transferred to Premier Oil ownership 2020)
 ETAP complex
 Marnock
 Mungo
 Monan
 Machar
 Mirren
 Madoes
 Erskine gas field (transferred to Ithaca Energy ownership)
 Everest gasfield (transferred to BG Group ownership 2006, transferred to Chrysaor ownership) 
 Harding oilfield (transferred to TAQA ownership 2012)
 Lomond gas field (transferred to BG Group ownership 2009, transferred to Chrysaor ownership 2017)
 Miller oilfield (ceased production 2007, decommissioned 2018)

Northern North Sea
 Bruce oil field (transferred to Serica Energy ownership)
 Magnus oilfield (transferred EnQuest ownership 2018)

West of Shetland
 Clair oilfield
 Foinaven oilfield (ceased production 2021)
 Schiehallion oilfield

Norway 
 Hod oilfield
 Tambar oilfield
 Ula oil field
 Valhall oil field
 Skarv oil field

Trinidad and Tobago
All fields of the Trinidad and Tobago business unit are operated from the BPTT office in Port of Spain.
 Mango gasfield

Gulf of Mexico Deepwater
The Gulf of Mexico business unit is operated from Houston, Texas.
 Atlantis Oil Field
 Mad Dog oil field
 Macondo Prospect site of the April 20, 2010, Deepwater Horizon explosion and oil spill

 Nakika
 Thunder Horse Oil Field
 Tiber Oil Field (announced 2009; production not commenced)

Alaska
The BP office for the Alaska business unit is located in Anchorage.
 Prudhoe Bay Oil Field

Azerbaijan
Azeri-Chirag-Guneshli, comprises five producing offshore facilities with estimated reserves of 5,5 billion barrels of oil.
Shahdeniz, estimated reserves around 35 tcf, or 1 billion m3 of gas.

Egypt
The Egypt business unit is operated from Cairo.

North American Gas
 Permian
 East Texas
 Arkoma
 Hugoton
 San Juan Basin
 Wamsutter
 Jonah/Moxa/Overthrust
 Tuscaloosa
 Woodford Shale

Vietnam
Vietnam operations are run from Sunbury-on-Thames, England.

Angola
Operations in Angola are run from the BP office in Sunbury-on-Thames, England.
Plutonio oilfield

Australasia
Operations in Australasia are managed from Jakarta, Indonesia and Perth, Australia.
North Rankin gasfield
Angel gasfield
Goodwyn gasfield

Russia

References 

 
Oil fields of the United Kingdom
Oil fields of England
Oil fields of Scotland
Lists of oil and natural gas fields